Keaton Tyndall and Kylie Tyndall (born Keaton Nicole Tyndall and Kylie Rae Tyndall on March 14, 1992 in Los Angeles, California) are identical twin actresses.

Career
They started acting at the age of 9 months, and have had roles in several movies and TV shows. In 2004, Keaton and Kylie landed the recurring roles of Phoebe Forrester and Steffy Forrester respectively on the CBS soap opera The Bold and the Beautiful, which would later earn them a Young Artist Award nomination for "Best Performance in a Television Series/Recurring Young Actress". Later that year Keaton and Kylie appeared as twin Gods in Joan of Arcadia. In 2007, Kylie and Keaton recur as Penny and Sissy Marquart on Big Love. In 2011, they starred in And They're Off as Megan (Keaton's role) and Katie (Kylie's role).

Filmography
Kylie's Roles:
 1993: Heart and Souls as Baby Thomas Reilly (uncredited)
 1994: Roseanne: An Unauthorized Biography as Jennifer Barr (Baby)(uncredited)
 1994: ER as Ashley (1 episode)
 1995: How to Make an American Quilt as Young Finn Dodd (uncredited)
 1998: Little Girl Fly Away as Young Ruth Finney (uncredited)
 1998: City of Angels as Hannah's Friend
 2003: Animal Jam as The Twins
 2003: The Wayne Brady Show as Cecylia Lisp (2 episodes)
 2003: Looney Tunes: Back in Action as Little Alienc #2 (uncredited)
 2004: Joan of Arcadia as Twin #1 God (1 episode)
 2004: The Way Station as Kathleen
 2004 - 2005: The Bold and the Beautiful as Steffy Forrester (30 episodes)
 2007: Insatiable as N/A (1 episode)
 2007: Big Love as Penny Marquart (3 episodes)
 2011: And They're Off as Katie

Keaton's Roles:
 1993: Heart and Souls as Baby Thomas Reilly (uncredited)
 1994: Roseanne: An Unauthorized Biography as Jennifer Barr (Baby)(uncredited)
 1994: ER as Ashley (1 episode)
 1995: How to Make an American Quilt as Young Finn Dodd (uncredited)
 1998: Little Girl Fly Away as Young Ruth Finney (uncredited)
 1998: City of Angels as Hannah's Friend
 2003: Animal Jam as The Twins
 2003: The Even Stevens Movie as Gotcha Family Daughter
 2003: Looney Tunes: Back in Action as Little Alienc #1 (uncredited)
 2004: Joan of Arcadia as Twin #2 God (1 episode)
 2004: The Way Station as Kaitlyn
 2004 - 2005: The Bold and the Beautiful as Phoebe Forrester (30 episodes)
 2007: Insatiable as N/A (1 episode)
 2007: Big Love as Sissy Marquart (3 episodes)
 2007: Cold Case as Heidi Jenner '94 (1 episode)
 2011: And They're Off as Megan

External links

1992 births
American child actresses
American soap opera actresses
American television actresses
American twins
Identical twin actresses
Living people
Actresses from Los Angeles
21st-century American women

fi:Keaton Tyndall